Germán Quiroga Jr.  (born May 29, 1980) is a Mexican professional stock car racing driver. In 2011, he became the first three-time NASCAR Corona Series champion.

Racing career

Beginnings
Quiroga began his career in Reto Neon in 1996.

Corona Series
In 2004, he began racing in the NASCAR Corona Series (NCS), racing for Jorge Seman's race team . During the following year, he won the Formula Renault championship. In 2005, he drove in the Infiniti Pro Series before returning to Desafio Corona for 2006. His first championship in the Corona Series came in 2009, while racing for Equipo Telcel. He won the championship again in 2010 and 2011.

Toyota All-Star Showdown
In 2011, Quiroga participated in the Toyota All-Star Showdown in Irwindale, California, racing for Bill McAnally. He finished in the 12th position behind fellow NCS driver Daniel Suárez.

Nationwide Series

Quiroga's first race in the NASCAR's national touring series came in 2007 in the Busch Series (now the Nationwide Series), competing in the series' then-annual event at Autódromo Hermanos Rodríguez for Jay Robinson Racing where he finished 28th.

Camping World Truck Series
He made his debut in the NASCAR Camping World Truck Series in 2011, competing in two events for Kyle Busch Motorsports at New Hampshire Motor Speedway and Homestead-Miami Speedway, with a best finish of 16th coming in his first race.

In 2012, Quiroga returned to KBM for a limited schedule of events, driving the No. 51 Toyota in four races at Talladega Superspeedway, Texas Motor Speedway, Phoenix International Raceway and Homestead. He moved to Red Horse Racing for the 2013 season, running the entire series schedule in an attempt to win the series' Rookie of the Year honors.

He also has worked part-time on NASCAR on NBC broadcasts, being part of mun2's broadcast of the NASCAR Toyota Series Toyota 120 at Phoenix International Raceway in February 2014.

Quiroga had a great start in 2014 season with five straight top ten finishes until Texas.

After sitting out 2015, he returned to drive part-time in the Red Horse's No. 11 truck in 2016 beginning at Texas.

Motorsports career results

American Open-Wheel racing results
(key) (Races in bold indicate pole position, races in italics indicate fastest race lap)

Barber Dodge Pro Series

NASCAR
(key) (Bold – Pole position awarded by qualifying time. Italics – Pole position earned by points standings or practice time. * – Most laps led.)

Busch Series

Camping World Truck Series

Corona Series

Busch East Series

 Season still in progress
 Ineligible for series points

References

External links
 
 
 Germán Quiroga at Driver Database

Living people
1980 births
Racing drivers from Mexico City
Mexican racing drivers
NASCAR drivers
Indy Lights drivers
Barber Pro Series drivers
TC 2000 Championship drivers
Latin America Formula Renault 2000 drivers